Adam Green's Aladdin is an independent film written, directed by, and starring Adam Green. It presents a modern take on the Arabian Nights classic tale. The film stars Alia Shawkat, Natasha Lyonne, Jack Dishel, Macaulay Culkin, and Nicole LaLiberte. The film explores themes of technology, government repression, greed, and true love. The film was partially funded through the crowdfunding website Kickstarter, and filmed over the summer of 2014. The film was released on April 15, 2016, through video on demand.

Premise
The film revolves around Aladdin's dysfunctional family, who live in an average American city ruled by a corrupt sultan with a decadent socialite daughter.

Cast

Adam Green as Aladdin
Alia Shawkat as Emily
Natasha Lyonne as Mom
Jack Dishel as Uncle Gary/The Sultan
Macaulay Culkin as Ralph
Nicole LaLiberte as Ms. President
Francesco Clemente as Mustafa, The Genie
Bip Ling as  Princess Barbara
Parker Kindred as Genarro Russo
Har Mar Superstar as  British Druggie Guy
John Wiley as Farmer Dave
Zoë Kravitz as Miner with Lamp
Sophia Lamar as The Stripper 
Devendra Banhart as Saucemaker 
Rodrigo Amarante as Mariachi Singer
Binki Shapiro as Miner
Andrew VanWyngarden as Guardian of the Lamp
Penn Badgley as Prince of Monaco
Leo Fitzpatrick as Bouncer
Neil Harbisson as Miner

Production

The film raised money through Kickstarter, with Green admitting that the bulk of the cost was spent on creating the cardboard sets, noting that "Most people did the movie for basically no money". Some of the smaller parts were performed by artists doing residencies at the nearby Pioneer Works studio. Green has stated that falling in love with his wife, Yasmin Green, heavily influenced the plot and that wedding vows that Aladdin gives are nearly identical to his own.

After completing the project, Green said he had some problems distributing it, with most film festivals finding it too "off brand". However, after releasing the trailer online, Green started to get offers for screening the film. Vice Media also got in contact with Green after seeing the trailer, asking him to pitch a TV show for their Viceland channel.

References

External links

American independent films
American comedy-drama films
2016 comedy-drama films
Films about dysfunctional families
Kickstarter-funded films
Films based on Aladdin
2010s English-language films
2010s American films